Hell in the Pacific is a 1968 World War II film directed by John Boorman and starring Lee Marvin and Toshirō Mifune, the only two actors in the film. It is based on the importance of human contact and the bond that can form between enemies if lacking other contact.

Plot
Two World War II servicemen, one American (Lee Marvin) and one Japanese (Toshiro Mifune), are stranded on an uninhabited Pacific island. The Japanese soldier suddenly discovers a military plane crash kit near his camp. The American, who survived the plane crash, watches him salvage the kit and confronts him on the beach. Both men have visions of getting beaten to death by the other, but in reality they only make aggressive gestures. The American notices that the Japanese has a small reservoir of drinking water and makes a dash to drink some, but is run off into the jungle. The Japanese sets fire to the jungle, smoking out the American. After chasing him off again, he wades out into the water to check his fishing trap. While his back is turned, the American makes another run for the drinking water, eventually stealing some and running off.

The next day, the American tries to steal more water, but is caught and falls on the reservoir, destroying it. After escaping, he destroys the fish trap, makes noises and plays tricks on the Japanese. After urinating on him from the cliff above, he is chased into the jungle by the infuriated Japanese, but collapses from dehydration. The Japanese takes him prisoner, binds his arms to a log and makes him walk back and forth in the sand. Eventually, the American escapes, surprises the Japanese and then binds him to the log and makes him walk back and forth in the sand. After getting frustrated trying to cook a meal, the American cuts the Japanese loose so that he can do the cooking. They cease hostilities and share chores and food from then on.

Later, the American notices the Japanese trying to build a raft. He scolds him for stealing "his" log to make the raft and for being sneaky about its construction. After observing what a poor attempt the raft is, he gets the idea that they should build a better one together. They argue over the design, but eventually work together and build a large raft. After setting sail and overcoming the strong waves of the reef, they hit open water.

Days later, they come upon a new set of islands, on one of which there appears to be an abandoned base. The Japanese takes the lead, since he recognizes it as a Japanese base. The American then spots American supplies and runs after him, imploring any soldiers who might hear to not fire because the Japanese is his "friend". At one point, startled by running into his friend, the American exclaims in relief, "for a moment there, I thought you were a Jap". Realizing that the base truly is abandoned, they rummage around for useful items and luxuries, eventually finding shaving supplies, a bottle of wine, cigarettes and an issue of Life magazine.

That night, each seeing the other clean shaven for the first time, they drink sake together, sing songs and tell each other stories, despite the language barrier. Casually, the Japanese picks up and looks through a Life magazine and is horrified to see photos of dead and imprisoned Japanese soldiers. The American gets upset that the Japanese is not answering a question about whether the Japanese believe in God and the two angrily glare at one another, too upset to notice the increasingly loud sounds of the island being shelled. The Japanese stands up and walks a few paces away and the American gets up and kicks over the campfire. As the Japanese turns and walks back, a shell hits the building that they are in and destroys it. In the alternative ending (available on home video releases), no shell hit occurs and the two men are shown going their separate ways.

Cast
 Lee Marvin as American Pilot
 Toshirō Mifune as Captain Tsuruhiko Kuroda

Production notes
The film contains little dialogue, and much like its predecessor – the film None but the Brave – is not dubbed or sub-titled, thus authentically portraying the frustration of restricted communication between the Japanese- and English-speaker. The film was entirely shot in the Rock Islands of Palau in the north Pacific Ocean, near the Philippines in the Philippine Sea.

The film was originally released with a rather abrupt ending, one that left many dissatisfied with the outcome of the struggle these men endured. The subsequent DVD release has an alternative ending, which while leaving the eventual destiny of the two ambiguous, was more in line with the overall direction of the film.

Both actors served for their respective countries during the Pacific War. Marvin, who was in the US Marines, was wounded and received the Purple Heart during the Battle of Saipan in 1944. Mifune served in the Imperial Japanese Army Air Service.

Box office
The film earned rentals of $1.33 million in North America and $1.9 million elsewhere. Because of the high costs involved, by 1973 the movie had recorded a loss of $4,115,000, making it one of the biggest money losers in the short history of ABC films.

Critical reception

See also 
 Enemy Mine, a 1985 film with a similar plot in a space war setting
 List of American films of 1968

References

External links

 
 
 
 

1968 films
1960s war drama films
1960s Japanese-language films
American war drama films
Anti-war films about World War II
Films about shot-down aviators
Pacific War films
1960s war adventure films
American World War II films
Films directed by John Boorman
Films set in Oceania
Films set on uninhabited islands
Films shot in Palau
Films scored by Lalo Schifrin
Two-handers
Cinerama Releasing Corporation films
American war adventure films
1960s English-language films
1960s American films